Pumpkin Center is an unincorporated community in Northeast Township, Orange County, in the U.S. state of Indiana.

History
The community was probably so named from its location in a pumpkin growing district.

Geography

References

Unincorporated communities in Orange County, Indiana
Unincorporated communities in Indiana